Manuel Sagarzazu (15 October 1903 – 25 July 1990) was a Spanish footballer. He played in two matches for the Spain national football team in 1927.

References

External links
 
 

1903 births
1990 deaths
Spanish footballers
Spain international footballers
Place of birth missing
Association football forwards
Real Unión footballers
Olympic footballers of Spain
Footballers at the 1928 Summer Olympics
People from Hondarribia
Sportspeople from Gipuzkoa
Footballers from the Basque Country (autonomous community)